Parliamentary elections were held in South Ossetia on 23 May 2004.

Electoral system
At the time of the election, South Ossetia's parliament had 34 seats. Of these, 15 were filled using the party-list proportional representation, 15 were filled using Single-member district plurality voting, and another 4 were vacant seats, designated for representatives from villages then under Georgian control, where elections were impossible to hold. This election was the last time this system was used, as in the 2009 election, all 34 seats were filled using party-list proportional representation.

Results
As of 13:00 local time, 52% of registered voters had cast their votes, crossing the electoral threshold of 50% plus one vote. The South Ossetian election commission has thus declared the elections valid.

The election was won by President of South Ossetia Eduard Kokoity's Unity Party, which got 9 of the 15 party-list seats (54.6% of all votes), as well as another 11 constituency seats, giving the party a controlling 20-seat majority. Znaur Gassiyev of the Unity Party was elected speaker, replacing Stanislav Kochiev of the Communist Party of South Ossetia. Gassiyev was one of the leaders of the Republic of South Ossetia in its forming days in the early 1990s, and acted as Head of State in 1991.

References

Elections in South Ossetia
South Ossetia
2004 in Georgia (country)
2004 in South Ossetia
Election and referendum articles with incomplete results